The 2015 Wisconsin Badgers football team represented the University of Wisconsin–Madison in the 2015 NCAA Division I FBS football season. The Badgers, led by first-year head coach Paul Chryst, were members of the West Division of the Big Ten Conference and played their home games at Camp Randall Stadium. On January 13, 2015, the Badgers hired offensive coordinator Joe Rudolph. The Badgers were the media preseason favorites to win the Big Ten West division. During fall camp prior to the start of the season Chryst announced the Badgers would return to a pro-style punt scheme instead of the shield punt scheme, also known as the spread punt scheme.  Two days after Wisconsin played in the Holiday Bowl defensive coordinator Dave Aranda was hired by LSU as their new defensive coordinator. At the end of the season, Wisconsin featured the #1 defense in college football, with opponents averaging just 13.1 points per game against the Badgers.

Recruiting

Watchlists and preseason awards

Vince Biegel (OLB)
 Bednarik Award, Bronko Nagurski Trophy, Lombardi Award

Michael Caputo (S)
 Lott IMPACT Trophy, Bednarik Award, Bronko Nagurski Trophy, Jim Thorpe Award

Corey Clement (RB)
 Maxwell Award, Doak Walker Award

Alex Erickson (WR)
 Biletnikoff Award 

Rafael Gaglianone (K)
 Lou Groza Award

Dan Voltz (C)
 Rimington Trophy, Outland Trophy

Schedule

Rankings

Game summaries

vs #3 Alabama

source

Miami (OH)

source

Troy

source

Hawaii

source

Iowa

source

at Nebraska

source

Purdue

source

at Illinois

source

Rutgers

source

at Maryland

source

#20 Northwestern

source

at Minnesota

Source

source

Holiday Bowl

Coaching staff

Roster

Departures
After enrolling early and attending spring training quarterback Austin Kafentzis announced that he would transfer from Wisconsin to the University of Nevada before the start of the 2015 season.

At the end of the season redshirt freshman quarterback D.J. Gillins announced that he would transfer as well, to Pearl River Community College. It was reported that Gillins likely transferred because he wouldn't fit in Paul Chryst's Pro-style offense, he was originally recruited by former head coach Gary Andersen as a more mobile dual-threat style quarterback.

Statistics

Team

Non-conference opponents

Big 10 opponents

Offense

Defense

Key: POS: Position, SOLO: Solo Tackles, AST: Assisted Tackles, TOT: Total Tackles, TFL: Tackles-for-loss, SACK: Quarterback Sacks, INT: Interceptions, PBU: Passes Broken Up, QBH: Quarterback Hits, FF: Forced Fumbles, FR: Fumbles Recovered, TD : Touchdown

Special teams

Big Ten Players of the Week
 Week 4 - Freshman of the Week - RB, Taiwan Deal
 Week 5 - Co-Defensive Player of the Week - LB, Joe Schobert
 Week 7 - Freshman of the Week - LB, T. J. Edwards
 Week 8 - Special Teams Player of the Week - P, Drew Meyer 
 Week 13 - Special Teams Player of the Week - P, Drew Meyer

Awards

 Vince Biegel
Third team All-Big Ten (Media)
Third team All-Big Ten (Coaches)
 Michael Caputo
Second team All-Big Ten (Media)
Second team All-Big Ten (Coaches)

 Joe Schobert
Jack Lambert Trophy
Butkus-Fitzgerald Linebacker of the Year
First team All-Big Ten (Coaches)
First team All-Big Ten (Media)
 Derek Watt
Big Ten Sportsmanship Award

2016 NFL Draft

2016 NFL Draft class

Signed undrafted free agents
 Michael Caputo, S, New Orleans Saints
 Alex Erickson, WR, Cincinnati Bengals
 Darius Hillary, CB, Cincinnati Bengals
 Tyler Marz, OT, Tennessee Titans
 Tanner McEvoy, QB/S/WR, Seattle Seahawks
 Joel Stave, QB, Minnesota Vikings
 Austin Traylor, TE, Dallas Cowboys

References

Wisconsin
Wisconsin Badgers football seasons
Holiday Bowl champion seasons
Wisconsin Badgers football